Acanthaluteres spilomelanurus , the bridled leatherjacket, is a species of fish of the family Monacanthidae in the order of Tetraodontiformes. It can reach 14 cm in total length.

Habitat
It is a fish of subtropical climate and demersal.

Geographical distribution
It is found in Australia, from Perth to Sydney .

Comments
It is harmless to humans.

See also
 Acanthaluteres brownii
 Acanthaluteres vittiger

References

Fish described in 1824